This is a list of Turkish Navy submarines that have served from 10 July 1920 to present.

Birinci İnönü class 

 German Type UB III submarine:

Dumlupınar 

version of  Italian Vettor Pisani-class submarine

Sakarya 

version of  Italian Argonauta-class submarine

Gür 

 German Type IA submarine

Ay class 

Ay-class (version of  German Type IXA submarine):

Oruç Reis class 

 (version of  Royal Navy S-class submarine):

Ex-US Balao class (unmodified type) 

Ex- US Navy Balao-class submarine:

Ex-US Balao class (Fleet Snorkel type) 

Ex- US Navy Balao-class submarine Fleet Snorkel type:

Ex-US Balao class (GUPPY IA type) 

Ex- US Navy Balao-class submarine GUPPY IA type:

Ex-US Balao class (GUPPY IIA type) 

Ex- US Navy Balao-class submarine GUPPY IIA type:

Ex-US Balao class (GUPPY III type) 

Ex- US Navy Balao-class submarine GUPPY III type:

Ex-US Tench class 

Ex- US Navy Tench-class submarine GUPPY IIA Program:

Ex-US Tang class 

Ex- US Navy :

Atılay class 

Atılay-class submarine  Howaldtswerke-Deutsche Werft Type 209/1200:

Preveze class 

Preveze-class submarine  Howaldtswerke-Deutsche Werft Type 209T1/1400:

Gür class 

Gür-class submarine  Howaldtswerke-Deutsche Werft Type 209T2/1400:

Reis-class
Six Reis-class submarines in production. Type 214 submarines featuring an air-independent propulsion (AIP) system developed by Howaldtswerke-Deutsche Werft GmbH (HDW).

Sources

External links 

 Serhat Guvenc, "Building a Republican Navy in Turkey: 1924–1939", International Journal of Naval History
 Denizaltı Filosu Komutanlığı
 Unofficial Homepage of Turkish Navy

Turkish Navy
Turkish Navy lists
 
Lists of ships of Turkey